Agyneta affinisoides is a species of sheet weaver found in Russia. It was described by Tanasevitch in 1984.

References

affinisoides
Spiders of Russia
Spiders described in 1984